This is a list of churches in Flintshire, Wales.

Active churches

Defunct churches

References 

Flintshire